His Uncle from Normandy (French: Son oncle de Normandie) is a 1939 French comedy film directed by Jean Dréville and starring Josseline Gaël, Jules Berry and Betty Stockfeld. 

Produced in 1938, it was not given a release until June of the following year. The film's sets were designed by the art directors Louis Le Barbenchon and Roland Quignon.

Cast
 Eddy Lombard as Jim Baxter
 Josseline Gaël as Brigitte
 Jules Berry as Joseph
 Pierre Larquey as Maître Curot
 Betty Stockfeld as Anna Carola
 Albert Broquin as Le gardien
 Paul Demange as Monsieur Claudinet
 Anthony Gildès as Le sourd
 Janine Merrey as Mélanie
 Alexandre Mihalesco as Le Piqué
 René Navarre as Le capitaine
 Georges Paulais as L'avocat général
 Gabrielle Rosny as La marchande de liqueurs
 Pierre Stéphen as Ambroise, le clerc de notaire
 Dahl Stockfeld as La secrétaire
 Marcel Vallée as Le président

References

Bibliography 
 Roust, Colin. Georges Auric: A Life in Music and Politics. Oxford University Press, 2020.

External links 
 

1939 films
French comedy films
1939 comedy films
1930s French-language films
Films directed by Jean Dréville
1930s French films